Tushka Bergen (born 1969, in London, England) is an Australian actress who has worked in Australia, England, Germany and the United States. In 1988, she was nominated for the AACTA Award for Best Performance by an Actress in a Mini Series for her role in Always Afternoon.

Her mother is New Zealander Beverley Bergen, a soprano opera singer and scriptwriter. Her father is Anthony Hose, a conductor and pianist. She is married to CNN International presenter John Vause, with whom she has one daughter, Katie Vause, born in 2004.

Filmography 

FILM

TELEVISION

Awards and nominations

References

External links 

Tushka Bergen at Film Reference

Australian film actresses
1969 births
Living people
Actresses from London
20th-century Australian actresses
21st-century Australian actresses
Australian television actresses
20th-century English women
20th-century English people
21st-century English women
21st-century English people
Australian expatriates in England
English people of New Zealand descent
Australian people of New Zealand descent